The Port of Kergroise is a commercial port located in the district of Kergroise, Lorient, on the south coast of Brittany, France. It is owned by the Region of Brittany since 2007 and managed by the Chamber of Commerce and Industry of Morbihan. Based on the annual tonnage processed, it is ranked as the 14th most important commercial port in France.

Built in 1910, it was expanded during the post-war reconstruction of the city. The docks were once again expanded in the 1970s and the installation of new equipment allowed it diversify. The access channel was dredged in the early 2010s, allowing easier access to Panamax size ships.

The port's activities are mainly import-oriented, consisting of hydrocarbons, food products and construction materials. It is also occasionally used for passenger transport and for military vessels trading with the arsenal of Lorient.

References 

This article has been translated in part from the French Wikipedia equivalent.

Ports and harbours of France